The Battle of Vyborg Bay or Battle of Viipuri Bay (2-13 March 1940) was the culmination of the Soviet Union's second offensive and the last battle in the Winter War.

The Battle 
The Mannerheim Line had been pierced in the Second Battle of Summa and Field Marshal Mannerheim had ordered on 15 February a general retreat to the Intermediate line. 
However, the effective deployment of the Red Army also broke through the Intermediate line and the Finnish troops were allowed to retreat further to the line Vyborg (Viipuri)– Tali – Noskuanselkä – Kuparsaari – Vuoksi on 27 February 1940.

The Soviet 7th Army under command of Kirill Meretskov, was now ordered to launch a two-sided flank movement and a direct frontal attack. The 10th and 28th Rifle Corps were to advance west of Vyborg across the frozen Vyborg Bay and the 19th Rifle Corps was to advance east of the city. The 34th and 50th Rifle Corps attacked directly towards Vyborg.

Despite many problems, the troops of the Northwest Front advanced to Vyborg, and on the morning of 10 March, the 28th Rifle Corps seized a bridgehead at Vilajoki, which was over five kilometers wide. At the same time, units of Cherevichenko's cavalry began advancing on the ice of the Gulf of Finland and concentrated on the island of Piisaari, from where he was preparing to bypass the city of Vyborg. 
However, flooded areas, supply problems and constant Finnish counterattacks prevented the Red Army from achieving any more visible progress, and until 12 March, the fighting was so intense that both sides in this area reached a state of complete exhaustion.

On 13 March, the Finnish delegation finally accepted Molotov's peace conditions in Moscow, allowing the ceasefire at 12:00.

See also 

 List of Finnish military equipment of World War II
 List of Soviet Union military equipment of World War II

Sources 
 The Soviet Invasion of Finland, 1939–40, by Carl Van Dyke : pp. 237–247.

References 

Vyborg Bay
1940 in Finland
February 1940 events
March 1940 events